Larinus sibiricus is a species of true weevil found in Eastern Europe and the Middle East.

The weevil feeds on Xeranthemum annuum (Asteraceae). Females lay eggs on the flowerheads, and larvae undergo development inside the flower heads. The species' larvae apparently are parasatized by Bracon urinator (Hymenoptera: Braconidae).

References 

Lixinae
Beetles of Europe
Beetles described in 1835